Iolaus coelestis, the eastern fine sapphire, is a butterfly in the family Lycaenidae. It is found in Nigeria (the eastern part of the country and the Cross River loop), Cameroon, Gabon, the Republic of the Congo, the Democratic Republic of the Congo and Zambia.

References

Butterflies described in 1926
Iolaus (butterfly)